Airports for antique airplanes are aerodromes with facilities appropriate to the aircraft of the early twentieth century, including, for example, turf runways. In many cases they are collocated with aircraft museums.

Aircraft built before the end of World War I had different requirements for the landing field than modern aircraft. Modern runways are built for maximum friction.  Antique aircraft, sensitive to crosswinds and often equipped with skids, benefit from a relatively slippery turf field. Aircraft museums often have turf runways to accommodate the old aircraft.

Examples
Examples include the following: 
Old Rhinebeck Aerodrome
Antiquers Aerodrome
Bayport Aerodrome
Old Warden Aerodrome
Pioneer Airport
Fantasy of Flight
Duxford Aerodrome
Antique Airfield
Great War Flying Museum at Brampton-Caledon Airport
Estonian Aviation Museum
Classic Flyers Museum at Tauranga Airport
Omaka Aviation Heritage Centre at Omaka Aerodrome
Museo del Aire (Madrid) at Cuatro Vientos Airport

References 

 
Airports by type